Talkback or talk back may refer to:

Talkback (album), a 1983 album by the Canadian band the Spoons
Talk Back (Kembe X album), 2016
Talkback, an alternate name for Marvel Comics superhero Chase Stein
Talkback (recording), an audio system used in recording studios for communications
Talkback (television production), an audio system used in TV shows
TalkBack Reader Response System, talkback system for internet reader response
Talk radio, radio format
Talkback (production company), a British television production company which merged with Thames Television
Talkback Thames, a company resulting from the merger of Talkback Productions and Thames Television
Google TalkBack, an accessibility service on Android

Programs
 Talkback (BBC Radio Ulster), a radio program in Northern Ireland, on air since 1986
 Talkback (TV show), a Philippine interactive current affairs-talk show television program broadcast on the ABS-CBN News Channel since 2000
 Talkback Classroom, an Australian radio program
 Talkback Live, a CNN talk show on air from 1994 to 2003
 Talkback with Jerry Galvin, an American comedic radio show, on air in the mid-1980s
 Talkback 16, viewer feedback segment of WNEP-TV's news broadcasts